Christopher C. Harmon is an American author, editor and independent scholar. He is a Distinguished Fellow at the Brute Krulak Center, Marine Corps University, and Adjunct Professor at the Institute for World Politics. Dr. Harmon directed the counterterrorism course at the Asia-Pacific Center for Security Studies. 
From 2007-2010 he was director of studies for the program on Terrorism and Security Studies at the George C. Marshall European Center for Security Studies. His expertise is in the fields of terrorism and counterterrorism, insurgency and revolutionary warfare, counter-insurgency, and international relations. Starting in 2003, Harmon lectured extensively on "how terrorist groups end," as at the Woodrow Wilson International Center for Scholars (20 March 2006); his publications in this arena date 2004 - 2014. He inaugurated the Kim T. Adamson Chair in Insurgency and Terrorism at the Marine Corps University, was for four years Horner Chair of Military Theory, and served for twelve years at Quantico as a full professor teaching subjects such as international relations, the theory and nature of war and strategy and policy. For many years he has taught at The Institute of World Politics, a graduate school of national security and international affairs, in Washington, D.C.

Published works include these books and articles
 (2021)  "A Citizen's Guide to Terrorism and Counterterrorism," Routledge 
 (2018)  "The Terrorist Argument: Modern Advocacy and Propaganda," (Brookings, 2018); co-authored with Dr. Randall Bowdish 
 (2014) "Terrorism," Oxford Bibliographies (Military History)
 (2014) "A Citizen's Guide to Terrorism and Counterterrorism," Routledge 
 (2012) "Spain's ETA Terrorist Group is Dying," Orbis, vol. 56 no. 4 (Fall).  
 (2010) Toward a Grand Strategy Against Terrorism (co-ed. & author) Dushkin/McGraw-Hill 
 (2007) Terrorism Today 2nd ed. Routledge 
 (2006) Are We Beasts? Churchill and the Moral Question of World War II Area Bombing    Naval War College Press 
 (2004)  "How Al Qaeda May End," Backgrounder #1760 (13 pp.); https://www.heritage.org/defense/report/executive-summary-how-al-qaeda-may-end
 (2000) "Terrorism Today," Frank Cass Publishers,

References

Marine Corps University faculty
Terrorism theorists
Living people
Year of birth missing (living people)